"Comme un corbeau blanc" (translation: Like a white raven) is a song by French singer Johnny Hallyday. It was released as a single and included on his 1973 studio album Insolitudes.

Composition and writing 
The song was written by Jean Renard and Gilles Thibaut. The recording was produced by Jean Renard.

Commercial performance 
In France the single spent two weeks at no. 1 on the singles sales chart (in March–April 1973).

Track listing 
7" single Philips 6009 334 (1973, France etc.)
 A. "Comme un corbeau blanc" (3:09)
 B. "La musique que j'aime" (5:07)

Charts

References

External links 
 Johnny Hallyday – "Comme un corbeau blanc" (single) at Discogs

1973 songs
1973 singles
French songs
Songs about birds
Johnny Hallyday songs
Philips Records singles
Number-one singles in France
Songs written by Jean Renard (songwriter)
Songs written by Gilles Thibaut